The Corridor Xa is a branch of the Pan-European Corridor X. It runs north–south between the cities of Graz and Zagreb through three countries: Austria, Slovenia and Croatia. The road route of Corridor Xa is concurrent with the European route E59 throughout its entire length.

Road route
The corridor starts at the A9 (Pyhrn Autobahn) highway in Graz, Austria.

In Slovenia the corridor continues from the Austrian border at Šentilj for  along the A1 motorway (Slovenika) to the city of Maribor and the Slivnica. There it switches to the A4 motorway for  until Draženci near Ptuj, continuing (while A4 construction is in progress) on the G9 main road for a few dozen kilometers to the Croatian border at Gruškovje.

The highway has three to six lanes throughout its entire length. Upon approaching Zaprešić interchange in suburban Zagreb, small backups on the mainline toll plaza are encountered at all times of day. The last part of the Corridor between Zaprešić and Lučko interchanges is part of the Zagreb bypass. Congestion can be bad at rush hour near interchanges, though.

Transport in Europe
Roads in Croatia
10a
Roads in Slovenia